Ali Hoseyna (also Romanized as ‘Alī Ḩoseynā) is a village in Sabzdasht Rural District, in the Central District of Bafq County, Yazd Province, Iran. At the 2006 census, its population was 10, in 4 families.

References 

Populated places in Bafq County